Catherine Parker (or variants)  may refer to:

K Langloh Parker, Australian writer
Katharine Parker, Australian composer
Kathy Parker Phillips, née Parker
Kathy Parker, American actress

See also
Katy Parker (disambiguation)